Michael Stich was the defending champion but did not compete that year.

Petr Korda won in the final 6–3, 6–2, 5–7, 6–1 against Gianluca Pozzi.

Seeds

  Petr Korda (champion)
  Carlos Costa (first round)
  Sergi Bruguera (second round)
  Brad Gilbert (quarterfinals)
  Amos Mansdorf (first round)
  Andriy Medvedev (second round)
  Andrei Cherkasov (first round)
  Fabrice Santoro (second round)

Draw

Final

Section 1

Section 2

External links
 1992 CA-TennisTrophy draw

Singles